Robert C. Brien (born 26 October 1944 in Sydney) was a tennis player in the 1960s and 1970s.

Tennis career
In 1963 Brien, with Greg Cotterill, won the Australian Championships Boys Doubles Championship.

As a 19-year-old who had been in the United States for four months, Brien reached the final at the Cincinnati tournament in 
1964 before losing to Herb Fitzgibbon.

According to an article in the 5 July 1964, edition of The Cincinnati Enquirer, Brien had defeated Neale Fraser, Owen Davidson, Tony Roche and Bill Lenoir.

Brien played collegiate tennis at Mississippi State University. He was an All-American in 1966 and 1967. Brien finished his collegiate tennis career with a 67–1 career winning record.

In 1981 Brien was inducted into the Mississippi State University Sports Hall of Fame.

Brien was inducted into the Mississippi Sports Hall of Fame in 1985.

References

Australian expatriate sportspeople in the United States
Australian male tennis players
Mississippi State Bulldogs tennis players
Tennis players from Sydney
Living people
1944 births
Grand Slam (tennis) champions in boys' doubles
Australian Championships (tennis) junior champions
20th-century Australian people